Agalloch / Nest is a split EP by American heavy metal band Agalloch and Finnish neofolk band Nest. It was released on August 2, 2004 by The End as a 10" picture disc limited to 1,000 copies.

Agalloch's "The Wolves of Timberline" is a neo-folk piece, utilizing a contemporary classical structure with acoustic guitars, mandolin, and cello. This track was only released on this split.

Nest's "Last Vestige of Old Joy" showcased their trademark style with traditional Finnish instruments and included vocal and acoustic guitar contributions from Agalloch members John Haughm and Don Anderson.

Aslak Tolonen of Nest provided the artwork for both sides.

Track listing

References

Nest (band) albums
Agalloch albums
Split EPs
2004 EPs